Keyham is a Victorian-built area of Plymouth in the English county of Devon.  It was built to provide dense cheap housing just outside the wall of  HM Dockyard Devonport for the thousands of civilian workmen. In the early-19th century, Devonport Dockyard was smaller than now; it was enlarged mid-century by Keyham Steam Yard - Keyham at that period was a suburb of Devonport itself. Keyham Steam Yard was one of the locations for the first trials of the Fairbairn patent crane.

The development of housing was so rapid that HMS Hotspur, later renamed HMS Monmouth, was provided as a chapel ship for Roman Catholic services until the Roman Catholic Church of Our Most Holy Redeemer was built in 1901. That church was destroyed by fire following a bombing raid in 1941 and it was rebuilt in 1954.

Parts of the southern end are now subject to massive redevelopment using a regeneration package. It has a railway station.

On 12 August 2021, a mass shooting occurred in the area, where a gunman, identified as 22-year-old Jake Davison, killed five people and injured two others, before killing himself. His motive remains undetermined, although his online activity made multiple references to the incel subculture.

References 

Suburbs of Plymouth, Devon